Highlights from the Plugged Nickel is a compilation album by American jazz musician Miles Davis, released on November 21, 1995, by Sony Music Records and recorded from December 22 through December 23, 1965 at the Plugged Nickel. It consists of several tunes from The Complete Live at the Plugged Nickel 1965.

Track listing 
"Milestones" (Davis) – 11:49
"Yesterdays" (Kern, Harbach) – 15:00
"So What" (Davis) – 13:36
"Stella by Starlight" (Washington, Young) – 13:09
"Walkin'" (Carpenter) – 11:01
"'Round About Midnight" (Hanighen, Monk, Williams) – 8:42

Personnel
Bob Blumenthal – liner notes
Miles Davis - trumpet
Frank Bruno – engineering
Ron Carter – bass
Michael Cuscuna – producing
Bud Graham – engineering
Herbie Hancock – piano
Don Hunstein – photography
J.J. Johnson – composing
Teo Macero – producing
Parkinson – mastering engineering, remixing
Julian Peploe – art direction, cover design
Wayne Shorter – tenor saxophone
Lee Tanner – photography
Tony Williams – drums

Charting and reviews

Reviews

Charting history

References

External links

1996 compilation albums
Albums produced by Teo Macero
Miles Davis compilation albums
Sony Records compilation albums